The Nigerian National Assembly delegation from Kogi comprises three Senators representing Kogi Central, Kogi East, and Kogi West, and nine Representatives representing Adavi, Ajaokuta, Ankpa, Bassa, Dekina, Ibaji, Idah, Igalamela-Odolu, Ijumu, Kabba/Bunu, Koton Karfe, Lokoja, Mopa-Muro, Ofu, Ogori/Magongo, Okehi, Okene, Olamaboro, Omala, Yagba East, and Yagba West (the 21 Local Governments of Kogi State).

Fourth Republic

9th Assembly (2019 - present)

8th Assembly (2015 - 2019)

7th Assembly (2011 - 2015)

6th Assembly (2007 - 2011)

5th Assembly (2003 - 2007) 
The following table details the members of the delegation for the 5th Assembly.

4th Assembly (1999 - 2003)

References

External links 

Official Website - National Assembly House of Representatives (Kogi State)
 Senator List
 

Kogi State
National Assembly (Nigeria) delegations by state